The iHeartRadio Music Award for Best Music Video is one of the awards handed out at the yearly iHeartRadio Music Awards. It was first awarded in 2017 and presented to Fifth Harmony for their song "Work From Home". Cardi B is the most nominated artist in this category, with a total of six nominations. BTS were the latest to receive this award for their song "Butter" in 2022.

Recipients

Artists with multiple nominations
6 nominations
 Cardi B

5 nominations
 Justin Bieber

4 nominations
 Ariana Grande

3 nominations
 Taylor Swift
 Dua Lipa
 Daddy Yankee
 Drake
 BTS
 Bruno Mars
 Ed Sheeran

2 nominations
 Rihanna
 Nicki Minaj
 Selena Gomez
 Ty Dolla Sign
 Calvin Harris
 J Balvin
 Shawn Mendes
 Blackpink
 Harry Styles
 The Weeknd

References

iHeartRadio Music Awards